Sinabad may refer to:
Sinabad, East Azerbaijan
Sinabad, Kerman
Sinabad, Lorestan
Sinabad, West Azerbaijan